Qaradağlı (also, Garadagly, Karadagly) is a village in the Agdam Rayon of Azerbaijan.

References 

Populated places in Aghdam District